The Hero Honda Ambition is a motorcycle launched by Hero Honda in 2002 with similar engine architecture as the Hero Honda CBZ with a reduced bore diameter but same stroke. This gave the Ambition a  swept volume single-cylinder engine.

Description 

The Hero Honda Ambition is a 135cc bike launched in India by Hero Honda with an Original Honda's 133.3cc over square and overhead camshaft engine with Keihin conventional CV carburetor. The Bike was unveiled in 2002 with a 5-speed constant mesh transmission and comes with self-start as optional. This motor generated 11.2ps of max power and 10.5Nm of peak torque  making the bike suitable for city commuting and allowing it to cruise out on the highway at good speeds. Hero Honda marketed the Ambition model as a commuter bike with Hero Honda CBZ original Honda platform engine in 133.3cc capacity. This bike came with CDI Advanced Micro processor ignition technology and was launched to compete with Bajaj Pulsar.

Hero Honda Ambition 135 

The bike was launched to fill the gap between 100cc and 150cc. Instead of launching a 125cc motorcycle, Hero Honda launched something powerful yet fuel efficient. T This Bike equipped with Keihin Conventional CV Carburetor and Complies (BS3) emission norms Bharat stage emission standards. The concept of Hero Honda in this motorcycle is it should be more powerful than 125cc motorcycles and more Fuel efficient than 150cc Motorcycles. The fairing of the bike was also scaled from the Hero Honda CBZ, However, the manufacturer failed to sell the expected number of units so the company revised and updated a facelift model in 2004 by changing conventional round headlamp design to the CBZ fairing. Despite this, it failed to sell the expected number of units and the bike was discontinued in 2005. It failed due to its price, which was costlier than its competitors bikes at that time. After this failure, Hero Honda updated the Ambition as an all new Hero Honda Achiever which shared only part of the side and tail panels set with same CBZ Xtreme Engine and Honda Unicorn engine.

Models list 
 Hero Honda Ambition (2002–2004) (BS2), This model came with a round headlamp and instrument cluster with 133.3 cc power plant.
 Hero Honda Ambition 135 (2004–2005) (BS2), This is a facelifted model which came with upgraded front visor and instrument cluster inspired by Hero Honda CBZ.

Advanced Micro Processor Ignition System 

Advanced Micro Processor Ignition System works in help of Bike sensors to the throttle cable and control of the bikes, which helps to improving the spark of the bike electronically. 
The Ambition was the first motor cycle in Hero Honda Featured Advanced Micro Processor Ignition System (AMI). This System plays a major role in delivering the better power, pickup and also improving the fuel consumption of the bike efficiently. This is the concept of Advanced Micro Processor Ignition System. After this ambition model, Hero Honda equipped this technology in all its 150cc to 200cc motorcycles to deliver better efficiency and pickup with less fuel consumption as claimed by Hero Honda.

References

Further reading 
 In Automobile Industry in India Brand Positioning Among two Wheeler Motor Cycles in India By Dr. M. Sirajudeen, Dr. U. Leyakath Ali Khan" Book, page No. 76, the launch details of both Hero Honda ambition and CBZ star with year details by authors.
 In Product Strategy and Corporate Success: Concepts and Cases from the Indian Automobile Industry, the authors mention Hero Honda Success Product strategy by mentioning their all bike models including Hero Honda Ambition 135.
 In Two-wheeler Industry in India An Introduction by T.P. Balaji Rajmanohar. Mention on page No. 166 about the Ambition Brand ambassadors.

Related 
Hero Honda CBZ 
Hero Honda Karizma
Hero Honda Karizma R
Hero Honda Karizma ZMR
Hero Honda Achiever
Hero Honda Splendor
Hero Honda Passion
Hero Honda Super Splendor
Hero Honda Hunk
Honda Unicorn
Honda Shine
Hero Pleasure
Honda Activa

Ambition
Motorcycles introduced in 1999